Duncan Bell (born 31 December 1976) is Professor of Political Thought and International Relations at the University of Cambridge, and a Fellow of Christ's College, Cambridge. He is based at the Department of Politics and International Studies (POLIS). He works principally on the history of modern British and American political thought, with a particular focus on ideologies of empire and international politics. His book "The Idea of Greater Britain" won the Whitfield Prize from the Royal Historical Society.

Books
The Idea of Greater Britain: Empire and the Future of World Order, 1860-1900 (Princeton University Press, 2007)
Reordering the World: Essays on Liberalism and Empire (Princeton University Press, 2016)
Dreamworlds of Race: Empire and the Utopian Destiny of Anglo-America (Princeton University Press, 2020)

References

External links
POLIS webpage

Living people
1976 births
Fellows of Christ's College, Cambridge
21st-century English historians